Saleh Selim (11 September 1930 - 6 May 2002) was the 10th president of the Egyptian Al Ahly Sporting Club. He also was a famous Egyptian football player and actor. He was nicknamed El Maestro because of his way of leading the Al Ahly football team to many victories. He then became the manager of the team, then member of the board of directors of the club. He finally became one of the most successful presidents of the club.

Early life 
Saleh was born on 11 September 1930 in Dokki, Giza, and his father is Dr. Mohamed Selim, one of the pioneers of Anesthesiology in Egypt. Selim's father knew his mother, Zein El Sharaf, when she was undergoing surgery at his hospital. He married her and she gave birth to three males. Saleh was the eldest, followed by Abdel Wahab and Tareq. Saleh Selim has been a footballer since childhood. In Dokki, Giza. He joined the Orman junior high school team, then the high school team during his studies at the Saadia school in the same district. In 1944 he joined the junior ranks of Al Ahly club after being discovered by Mr. Hassan Kamel, supervisor of the club's team. He quickly succeeded in proving his presence and talent, and was promoted to the first team at the age of seventeen. He played his first game (friendly) in front of the Al Masry club in 1948, and Al Ahly won two goals to one with Saleh scoring the winning goal. Though his first official game was against Alexandria in the third week of the Egyptian league championship season of 1948 and Al Ahly achieved victory.

Career

Selim joined Al Ahly club in 1944 as a football player. Later, he became the club's football team manager, then a member of the board of directors. Due to the fame he gained as a football player, Saleh was dragged into show business and starred in three movies. He co-starred in the 1962 film titled "Black Candles" directed by Ezz El-Dine Zulficar, with Nagat El-Sagheera in the leading role where she sang in it her widely known song "Do not lie". In 1980, he was elected the president of Al Ahly. He was then re-elected five successive times.

During his presidency, Al-Ahly was elected the African club of the century. On 22 May 2001 Saleh received the award in Johannesburg. He died in 2002 of liver cancer.

Saleh Selim was the first Egyptian soccer player in Austria and it was a "transfer-sensation" when he joined Grazer AK and scored 3 goals in 6 championship-games (10/6 with friendly-games included) for the oldest Styrian football club during the 1962–63 season.

National team appearances
 First Egypt national team appearance was vs Turkey in East Mediterranean Cup 1 February 1950 (Egypt won 3/0)
 Participated in Olympic games 1960
 Participated in African Cup of Nations 1959 & 1962 (Played 3 games & Scored 1 Goal) (One title & one runner up)

Honours

Egypt
 Winner of 1959 Africa Cup of Nations 
 2nd place in 1962 Africa Cup of Nations

Al Ahly
 11 Egyptian Premier League titles
 8 Egypt Cup titles

Individual
 Saleh Selim won 9 successive League titles (1948/49 To 1958/59) (Egyptian Alltime Record)
 He scored 92 Goals for Al Ahly, 78 in Egyptian league & 14 in Egyptian Cup.

Career as a manager
 Al Ahly Football Official 1971
 Al Ahly Club Board Member 1972
 Al Ahly Club President: From 12 December 1980 till 16 December 1988 & from 6 February 1992 till 6 May 2002
 Elected five times 1980-1984-1992-1996-2000

Family
Selim was born in Cairo in 1930. His father Mohamed Selim was a renowned physician. He had two younger brothers, Abdelwahab and Tariq Selim. He also has two sons Khaled and Hisham Selim who was an actor.

References

1930 births
2002 deaths
Footballers from Cairo
Egyptian footballers
Association football midfielders
Egypt international footballers
Al Ahly SC players
Cairo University alumni
Egyptian expatriate footballers
Expatriate footballers in Austria
Egyptian expatriate sportspeople in Austria
Grazer AK players
1959 African Cup of Nations players
1962 African Cup of Nations players
Africa Cup of Nations-winning players
Footballers at the 1960 Summer Olympics
Olympic footballers of Egypt
Egyptian Premier League players
Deaths from liver cancer